Narodnya Naviny Vitsebska is a non-governmental news website in Belarus. The main editor is photographer Syarzhuk Serabro. The website is working at least since 2006, and is updated daily.

External links 
 

Belarusian news websites